Ian Forbes Begg (12 February 1911 – 18 March 1989) was an Anglican prelate who served in the Scottish Episcopal Church as the Bishop of Aberdeen and Orkney from 1973 to 1976.

Biography
He was born on 12 February 1911, the son of the Reverend John Smith Begg and Elizabeth Macintyre. He was educated at the University of Aberdeen, graduating with a Master of Arts in 1931. He was ordained a deacon in 1933 and a priest in 1935. His first pastoral appointment was a curate at St Paul's Church in Liverpool from 1933 to 1934. He moved to Scotland, where his next appointments were as curate-in-charge at St Ninian's Church, Aberdeen (1935–1973), Canon of St Andrew's Cathedral, Aberdeen (1965–1969), and Dean of Aberdeen and Orkney (1969–1972). During that time, he married Lillie Taylor Paterson in 1949, and was bestowed an Honorary Doctorate of Divinity from the University of Aberdeen in 1971.

He was consecrated the Bishop of Aberdeen and Orkney on 1 March 1973, the principal consecrator was Francis Moncreiff, the Primus of the Scottish Episcopal Church, with bishops Sprott, Wimbush, Hare Duke, Sessford, Easson, Russell, Wilson, and Thomas as co-consecrators.

After his retirement in 1977, he was priest-in-charge of St Machar's Church, Bucksburn, on the outskirts of Aberdeen. He died on 18 March 1989, aged 78.

References

Bibliography

1911 births
1989 deaths
Bishops of Aberdeen and Orkney
Deans of Aberdeen and Orkney